General Count Carl August Ehrensvärd (3August 1892 – 24April 1974) was a Swedish Army officer. He was born in Karlskrona, and was son of the admiral and Minister for Naval Affairs, Carl August Ehrensvärd. Ehrensvärd left the Swedish Army in 1918 and joined the Finnish Army and saw action during the Finnish Civil War. Ehrensvärd rejoined the Swedish Army the same year and served until 1940 when he became general Ernst Linder's Chief of Staff during the Winter War as part of the Swedish Volunteer Corps. Back again in the Swedish Army, Ehrensvärd held positions such as Chief of the Defence Staff and Chief of the Army. He retired in 1957.

Early life and family
Ehrensvärd was born on 3 August 1892 in Karlskrona, Sweden, the son of Admiral, Count Carl August Ehrensvärd (1858–1944) and Baroness Lovisa Ulrika (Ulla), née Thott. He was the brother of Vice Admiral Gösta Ehrensvärd (1885–1973) and Deputy Director of the Ministry of Defence Augustin Ehrensvärd (1887–1968). He was the uncle of chemist Gösta Ehrensvärd (1910–1980). His great-grandfather was the fortress builder Augustin Ehrensvärd, his uncle was Albert Ehrensvärd and his cousin was Archibald Douglas, Ehrensvärd's predecessor on the Chief of the Army post. He passed studentexamen in 1911.

Career
Ehrensvärd became an officers volunteer in the Svea Life Guards (I 1) in 1911. He was the Queen's Page of Honour in 1912 and a cadet at the Royal Military Academy the same year. Ehrensvärd became a second lieutenant in the Svea Life Guards (I 1) in 1913 and became lieutenant there in 1915. He took part in the Åland Expedition as adjutant of the commanding officer of Åland Detachment in 1918 and resigned from the Swedish Army the same year and joined the Finnish Army where he commanded the Archipelago Free Corps (Skärgårdens frikår) and took part in battles in Åboland archipelago and southwestern Finland (Korpogård 28 March, Lohm 4 April and Loimaa 22 April).

He was promoted to major in the Finnish Army in May 1918 and was then reinstated in the Swedish Army as lieutenant in the Svea Life Guards (I 1) in September the same year. Ehrensvärd then attended the Royal Swedish Army Staff College from 1920 to 1922 and was a cadet of the General Staff from 1923 to 1925. He was staff adjutant and was promoted to captain of the General Staff in 1926 and served in the Svea Life Guards (I 1) in 1927 and was a teacher at the Royal Swedish Army Staff College from 1928 to 1934. Ehrensvärd was captain in the Svea Life Guards (I 1) in 1931 and staff adjutant and captain of the General Staff in 1932. He was major and chief adjutant of the General Staff in 1934 and in 1935. He was head of the Central Department of the General Staff from 1935 to 1937 and the Army Operations Department in the Defence Staff from 1937 to 1938.

Ehrensvärd was major and chief adjutant in the General Staff Corps from April to July 1937 and was in October of that year promoted to lieutenant colonel and chief adjutant in the General Staff Corps. He was lieutenant colonel and commanding officer of the tank battalion at Göta Life Guards (I 2) from 1938 to 1939 and the tank battalion at Skaraborg Regiment (I 9) in 1939. Ehrensvärd was lieutenant colonel and Chief of Staff of the Swedish Volunteer Corps during the Winter War in Finland in 1940. There he took part in operations in Lapland during 1940. Ehrensvärd was promoted to colonel in the Finnish Army in 1940 and colonel in the Swedish Army the same year. He was head of the Royal Swedish Army Staff College from 1940 to 1941 and commanding officer of South Scania Infantry Regiment (I 7) from 1941 to 1942. Ehrensvärd was section chief in the Defence Staff from 1942 to 1944 and was promoted to major general and appointed acting Chief of the Defence Staff in 1944. He was Chief of Defence Staff from 1945 to 1947. Ehrensvärd had the military responsibility for the Swedish stay-behind operation which was organised starting from 1946. He served as military commander of the I Military District from 1947 to 1948. Ehrensvärd was promoted to lieutenant general and was appointed Chief of the Army in 1948.

The year before, in 1947, a proposal to appoint pro-German colonel Alf Meyerhöffer as army infantry inspector led to the so-called "Meyerhöffer affair" when the proposal met with great opposition from the Social Democratic government. A compromise made Meyerhöffer acting infantry inspector in 1947. Following threats of resignation from Ehrensvärd's cousin and Chief of the Army, Archibald Douglas, Meyerhöffer was finally appointed cavalry and infantry inspector in 1949. The far more Western-friendly Ehrensvärd had been appointed Chief of the Army in 1948 which led Meyerhöffer into conflict with his new commanding officer and he therefore lodged his resignation in 1951. Ehrensvärd was intended to have become Supreme Commander but was rejected by Allan Vougt on the grounds that Ehrensvärd was better suited for war than peace.

In 1956, Ehrensvärd appointed major Sigmund Ahnfeldt as UN battalion commander in Gaza. The government opposed the nomination because of Ahnfeldt's previous involvement in the Lindholm movement. Ahnfeldt had been Sven Olov Lindholm's closest man for six years and had at the age of 27 candidated for the National League of Sweden after Meyerhöffer at the municipal elections in Östersund. Ehrensvärd threatened to resign unless he got his way, according to prime minister Tage Erlander. Ahnfeldt was persuaded, however, by defence minister Torsten Nilsson to resign from the post. Ehrensvärd was Chief of the Army until 1957 when he was promoted to full general and transferred to the reserve.

In the early 1960s, the secret documents from Operation Stella Polaris in 1944, were brought from Hörningsholm Castle and Rottneros Manor and burnt on the instruction of the then Director-General of the National Defence Radio Establishment, Gustaf Tham, and the now pensioned general Ehrensvärd.

Personal life
Ehrensvärd married the first time on 21 July 1922 in Lützow, Germany with countess Gisela Dorothée Anna-Luise Marianne Lilla von Bassewitz (20 December 1895 – 1946), the daughter of count Adolf Carl Otto Alexander Bassewitz-Behr and Dorothée Louise Helene Wanda Ebba Krell. He married a second time on 8 November 1947 in Malmö, Sweden with Svea Elisabeth Lachmann, née Olsson (born 15 June 1905), the daughter of carpenter Ola Olsson and Hanna Jönsson. Ehrensvärd was the father of Louise (born 30 June 1925 in Stockholm) and Jörgen (born 6 May 1932 in Stockholm). Ehrensvärd and his wife lived at Charlottenlund Castle.

Death
Ehrensvärd died on 24 April 1974 in Ystad and was buried at Tosterup cemetery.

Dates of rank

Swedish Army
1913 – Underlöjtnant
1915 – Lieutenant
1926 – Captain
1934 – Major
1937 – Lieutenant colonel
1940 – Colonel
1944 – Major general
1948 – Lieutenant general
1957 – General

Finnish Army
1918 – Major
1940 – Colonel

Awards and decorations
Ehrensvärd's awards:

Swedish
   Commander Grand Cross of the Order of the Sword (15 November 1948)
  Commander 1st Class of the Order of the Polar Star
  Knight of the Order of Vasa
  Home Guard Medal of Merit in Gold
  Swedish Central Federation for Voluntary Military Training Medal of Merit in gold
  Swedish Women's Voluntary Defence Organization Royal Medal of Merit in gold
 Healthcare Gold Medal (Sjukvårdsguldmedalj) (Swedish Red Cross)
 Swedish Civil Defence League's gold medal (Sveriges civilförsvarsförbunds guldmedalj)
 Central Board of the National Swedish Rifle Association's silver medal (Sveriges skytteförbunds överstyrelses silvermedalj)
 Equestrian Olympic Medal (Ryttarolympisk förtjänstmedalj)

Foreign
  Grand Commander of the Order of the Dannebrog
  Grand Cross of the Order of the Star of Ethiopia
  Grand Cross of the Order of the White Rose of Finland
  Grand Cross of the Order of St. Olav (1 July 1956)
  Grand Officer of the Legion of Honour
  Order of the Cross of Liberty, 2nd and 4th Class with swords
  Officer of the Order of the Three Stars
  Officer of the Order of Orange-Nassau with swords
 Danish Medal of Freedom (Dansk frihetsmedalj)
 2 x Finnish War Memorial Medal (Finsk krigsminnesmedalj)
 Finnish commemorative medal Pro benignitate humana

Honours
Member of the Royal Swedish Academy of War Sciences (1935)

Bibliography

References

1892 births
1974 deaths
Swedish counts
Swedish Army generals
Chiefs of Army (Sweden)
People from Karlskrona
People of the Finnish Civil War (White side)
Volunteers in the Winter War
Members of the Royal Swedish Academy of War Sciences
Commanders Grand Cross of the Order of the Sword
Commanders First Class of the Order of the Polar Star
Knights of the Order of Vasa
Grand Commanders of the Order of the Dannebrog
Grand Officiers of the Légion d'honneur
Officers of the Order of Orange-Nassau
Grand Crosses of the Order of Saint-Charles
Chiefs of the Defence Staff (Sweden)
Recipients of orders, decorations, and medals of Ethiopia